Grand Rapids Gerald R. Ford International Airport  is a commercial airport in Cascade Township approximately  southeast of Grand Rapids, Michigan, United States. The facility is owned by the Kent County Board of Commissioners and managed by an independent authority.  The Federal Aviation Administration (FAA) National Plan of Integrated Airport Systems for 2017–2021 categorized it as a small hub primary commercial service facility.

The facility opened as the Kent County Airport and later became Kent County International Airport. In December 1999, the airport was renamed for Gerald R. Ford, the 40th Vice President and the 38th President of the United States. Ford represented the Grand Rapids area in the United States House of Representatives from 1949 to 1973.

The airport is the largest commercial airport in the West Michigan region and is the second-largest airport in Michigan after Detroit Metropolitan Airport.

The airport currently has flights to 37 domestic airports.

History
This was eight years after the area witnessed its first landing, a Wright biplane at Comstock Park State Fairgrounds on September 10, 1911. The airport was operated by the Kent County Board of Supervisors.

The first scheduled air service in the United States was between Grand Rapids and Dearborn on a Ford-Stout monoplane named Miss Grand Rapids, which started July 26, 1926.

In 1938–39, the Works Progress Administration made improvements including new runways and runway widening, fencing, sodding, lighting, remodeling the administration building and construction of a new restaurant.

Circa 1940, the airport extended between 32nd and 36th Streets, from Jefferson Avenue east to the railroad; the west end was soon expanded south to just north of Himes Street and in the 1950s runway 18/36 was extended to 5700’ and reached south to 44th Street.

In 1959, the county began construction on the present airport in Cascade Township, several miles east of the first airport. The new airport opened November 23, 1963, and was dedicated June 6, 1964; it had a  runway designated 08/26 and a  designated 18/36. The first scheduled jet was a United Airlines Boeing 737-200 on April 28, 1968, from Chicago O'Hare. The aircraft, N9003U, was named 'City of Grand Rapids'. In 1968, the only scheduled non-stops beyond Michigan were to Chicago and Green Bay.

On January 27, 1977, the Board of Commissioners renamed Kent County Airport as Kent County International Airport with the opening of a U.S. Customs Service Office in the main terminal building.

In 1997, the board added the  runway 17/35 to allow continued operations during a $32 million reconstruction of runway 8R/26L, completed in 2001. It completed a passenger terminal renovation in 2000 at a cost of approximately $50 million.

In 2004, the airport served more than 2 million passengers for the first time in a year. In 2010, the airport broke the 2004 record with almost 2.2 million passengers, as increase of over 23% from 2009.

On January 2, 2007, a U.S. Air Force jet carried the remains of former president Gerald Ford to his namesake airport as part of funeral services culminating in burial at his presidential museum in Grand Rapids the next day.

From April 2010 through October 2011, the airport was a focus city for Allegiant Air.

Air Canada operated the airport's only international flights to Toronto Pearson International Airport from July 2008 until September 2013.  It was the airline's second attempt at service between the two markets.

Delta Air Lines operates Boeing 757-200s seasonally between Grand Rapids and Detroit during the summer, making it the largest aircraft to serve GRR.

Allegiant Air announced in mid-January 2019 that they would be making the airport one of Allegiant's 16 focus cities once again. After dropping GRR as a focus city in 2011, Allegiant is upgrading GRR again to a focus city adding Nashville, Tennessee, and Savannah-Hilton Head, Georgia, as new routes.

Facilities
Gerald R. Ford International Airport has two parallel east–west runways and one north–south runway. Along with cargo and general aviation facilities, the airport has a passenger terminal with two concourses: A has seven gates and B has eight. Runways 08R/26L and runway 17/35 have ILS. The airport also has a  general aviation runway north of the main 08R/26L runway.

In September 2017, the airport celebrated the opening of phase one of their Gateway Transformation, a 59,000 square foot addition onto the passenger terminal facility that included a consolidated passenger security screening checkpoint, a new Marketplace with expanded retail and food & beverage offerings, new business centers and lounges, and much more. Concourse A's tenants are Allegiant Air, Delta Air Lines and Frontier Airlines. American Airlines, Southwest Airlines and United Airlines occupy Concourse B. All gates have climate-controlled jetways.

The airport is served by Signature Flight Support, which operates an FBO on the field. Besides fuel, the facility provides general maintenance, aircraft parking, courtesy and rental cars, conference rooms, pilot supplies, a crew lounge, snooze rooms, and more.

When new baggage screening regulations were introduced by the Transportation Security Administration in 2002, the airport was the first in the nation to conduct trials on the new screening machines. The baggage processing areas were too small for the machines so they were placed in the passenger lobby.

The airport is also home to the West Michigan Aviation Academy, a public charter high school that focuses on aviation, STEM, and robotics educations. The school offers a fleet of Cessna 172 aircraft for flight training, allows students to build a Carbon Cub EX2 plane, and has a Redbird LD flight simulator.

Airlines and destinations

Passenger

Source:

Cargo
Source: Flight Aware

Statistics

Top domestic destinations

Airline market share

Annual traffic

Ground transportation
The airport is at the intersection of 44th Street and Patterson Avenue. It abuts I-96 on the east, M-6 on the south, M-37 on the west, and M-11 on the north.

Metro Cab and Metro Cars provides taxi and luxury sedan service and the airport is served by Avis, Budget, Enterprise, Hertz, and National/Alamo rental car companies on-site.

Rapid route 17, Woodland/Airport, travels between the airport and Woodland Mall (Kentwood Station) on weekdays between 6:30 a.m. and 10:30 p.m. From Woodland Mall, passengers can continue on to downtown or parts of the east side of Grand Rapids via routes 5 and 6, or across town to Grandville and Wyoming on routes 24, 28, and 44.

Planned development
In 2013 the airport began building a natural treatment system to improve stormwater management practices and safeguard the waters of the Thornapple River. The new, innovative system will include a biological treatment system that will improve collection of stormwater runoff and naturally remove sediments and pollutants before sending the water to the Thornapple River, which flows just east of the airfield.

The airport eliminated the two separate security checkpoints in each concourse and created one consolidated checkpoint in the grand hall area to help traffic flow much faster and to be prepared for future growth. In addition, the grand hall area and the entrance area to the airport was renovated with more shopping and dining options. Work began in late 2015 and completed in June 2017. Concourse A and B were recently refurbished and completed in early 2015.

The airport began construction of a roof over the parking deck in March 2015 to increase close-in, covered, long-term parking. The roof covers most of the fourth floor, though some spaces on the fourth and third floors remain uncovered due to airfield sight-line requirements for the FAA control tower. The garage roof was completed in November 2015 and will allow use of the fourth floor spaces during heavy snow.

In 2016, the airport partnered with the Cascade Community Foundation on plans to renovate the current outdoor viewing area to make it a larger, more inviting place for people to relax.  The renovated park opened in May 2017.

In November 2018 the airport began the phase II of the Gateway Transformation Project, reconstructing the baggage claim, check-in, and front of house areas, and have completed the apron reconstruction adding new pavement to the apron and taxiway areas.

In late August 2019, the airport made an announcement about its next focus, Project Elevate. This phase of airport development, consisting of three major projects, includes a $90 million expansion and extension of Concourse A to encompass 8 more gates, a $50 million relocation and construction of a new air traffic control tower as well as a $25 million federal inspection station to facilitate departures and arrivals of direct international flights.

Accidents & Incidents
On May 9, 2008, a Cessna 208 Caravan operating for Federal Express by CSA Air crashed just north of Grand Rapids. The pilot was injured.
On September 6, 2010, a Cessna 210 Centurion that departed from Grand Rapids made an emergency landing in a field due to an engine failure. The aircraft was on a training flight at the time of impact. The probable cause of the accident was found to be a fatigue failure of the crankshaft due to the loss of engine case through-bold torque.
On October 29, 2012, a Delta Air Lines McDonnell Douglas MD-88 diverted to the airport after an engine issue. The engine was shut off and the plane was able to land safely.
On January 9, 2022, an aircraft returned to the airport due to a landing gear problem. It landed safely back at the airport.
On July 8, 2022, an American Airlines flight en route from Chicago to Buffalo, New York diverted to Grand Rapids due to smoke in the cockpit. The plane landed safely and there were no injuries.
On December 16, 2022, a Delta Air Lines Airbus A320 departed Grand Rapids for Minneapolis–Saint Paul and returned shortly after departure following an engine failure. The aircraft landed safely and the 147 passengers and crew were uninjured.

References

External links

Michigan Bureau of Aeronautics

Transportation in Grand Rapids, Michigan
Airports in Michigan
Ford
Economy of Grand Rapids, Michigan
Transportation buildings and structures in Kent County, Michigan
Works Progress Administration in Michigan